La Malbaie is a municipality in the Charlevoix-Est Regional County Municipality in the Province of Quebec, Canada, situated on the north shore of the St. Lawrence River at the mouth of the Malbaie River. It was formerly known as Murray Bay. La Malbaie is the seat of the judicial district of Charlevoix.

Although the main business district is located at the mouth of the Malbaie River, the town itself covers a vast area that extends inland along both sides of the Malbaie River and north and south along the St. Lawrence River. The village of Pointe-au-Pic amalgamated with La Malbaie in 1995, and the villages of Rivière-Malbaie, Saint-Agnès, Cap-à-l'Aigle, and Saint-Fidèle were added in 1999. The neighbouring town of Clermont is located a short 7 km along the Malbaie River.

History
1605: French explorer Samuel de Champlain fails to find suitable anchorage on his arrival in the area in May and names the bay Malle Baye (old French for “bad bay”).

1688: Rudimentary settlement begins at La Malbaie to export lumber to France, but the focus quickly turns to the fur trade and beluga fishing.

1724: A farm established at La Malbaie begins providing meat and grain to the French king's trading posts along the St. Lawrence River.

1763: Two Scottish officers of the British Army—John Nairne (1731–1802) and Malcolm Fraser (1733–1815)—receive concessions in the area from the British Crown. Nairne's encompasses the tiny settlement of La Malbaie and the western side of the Malbaie River. Fraser's stretches to the east. They also rename the bay, settlement, and river “Murray Bay” after James Murray (1721–1794), a British general and the successor to Wolfe. Murray Bay never becomes the official name, but is the internationally accepted toponym in the 18th and 19th centuries even though La Malbaie remains in local use.

1774: The parish of Saint-Étienne-de-la-Malbaie is founded.

1825: The parish is canonically established.

1830: The steamship Waterloo pays a visit to La Malbaie “on a pleasure trip,” the first such recorded commercial visit.

Circa 1840: For the first time, well-to-do visitors begin to summer in La Malbaie.

1853: Construction of a quay on piles at Pointe-au-Pic makes it possible for steamers to begin providing regular service to leisure travellers.

1855: The Parish Municipality of Saint-Étienne-de-Murray-Bay is founded.

1876: The Murray Bay Golf Club opens, the third oldest course in North America and the oldest still operating at the same location.

1892: Future president of the United States William Howard Taft and his family begin summering in La Malbaie, where he will visit every year for nearly forty years except for his term of office as president.

1896: The village itself is separated from the parish municipality and incorporated as the Village Municipality of La Malbaie.

1899: The luxurious 250-room Manoir Richelieu opens its doors to serve the flood of summertime visitors.

 
1914: Newly retired U.S. president William Howard Taft becomes president of the Murray Bay Golf Club, a position he will hold for seven years.

1925: A second golf course opens, the competition-class Manoir Richelieu course.

1928: At the end of the tourist season, the Manoir Richelieu is completely destroyed by fire. It will be rebuilt before the next season begins in 1929.

1957: Saint-Étienne-de-Murray-Bay is renamed Saint-Étienne-de la-Malbaie.

1958: The Village Municipality of La Malbaie officially becomes a town.

1965: The Town of La Malbaie annexes the parish municipality.

1995: The Town of La Malbaie and the Village Municipality of Pointe-au-Pic merge to form the Town of La Malbaie–Pointe-au-Pic.

1999: The Municipalities of Rivière-Malbaie and Saint-Fidèle, the Village Municipality of Cap-à-l’Aigle, the Parish Municipality of Saint-Agnès, and the Town of La Malbaie–Pointe-au-Pic amalgamate to form the new Town of La Malbaie.

2018: La Malbaie's Manoir Richelieu plays host to the 44th G7 summit, hosted by Prime Minister Justin Trudeau.

La Malbaie has a long history as a holiday destination. Tourism in the area began to develop as far back as 1760 when the Scottish feudal lords John Nairne and Malcolm Fraser began receiving visitors to the region at their estates. The family of Charlotte Holt Gethings is thought to be among the very first to come to La Malbaie for summer holidays, beginning around 1840. Every summer, particularly from the late 1800s on, “Murray Bay” welcomed America's most fashionable families. They picnicked and played, went fishing and swimming, and entertained lavishly in their sprawling but modestly named “cottages” on The Boulevard (today's “Chemin des Falaises”). Many of their descendants still visit every summer to this day.

People called Murray Bay the “Newport of Canada.” Tycoons mingled with mayors and governors and justices of the Supreme Court, there to escape the sweltering cities to the south. And conversation was “easy, intimate, and usually about golf” reported New Yorker magazine in 1924.

One regular visitor of note for nearly forty years was William Howard Taft, who served as president of the United States from 1909 to 1913. He once famously remarked that “The invigorating air of Murray Bay exhilarates like champagne without the effects of the morning after.” The residents of Murray Bay were very demonstrative in their affection for Taft, referring to him as “le petit juge,” lifting their caps to him as he drove by, and performing burlesque sketches during the winter months in which he was played by the most rotund villager. They burned a candle at the time of his death, and spat upon hearing of his betrayal by Theodore Roosevelt. Members of the Taft family are still a part of the local summer scene.

The American heritage of La Malbaie is still present in the inns and country homes, in bed & breakfasts frozen in time, and in the imposing Fairmont Manoir Richelieu, which hosted the world's political elite at the 44th G7 Summit in June 2018.

Geography

La Malbaie is located in the Charlevoix Seismic Zone, which is the most active seismic zone in Eastern Canada. La Malbaie is notable for having an extremely high seismic risk, although a significant earthquake has not occurred in the region recently.

Demographics 

Mother tongue:
 English as first language: 0.4%
 French as first language: 98.0%
 English and French as first language: 0%
 Other as first language: 1.6%

Local government

The following is a list of Mayors of La Malbaie.

 Joseph Couturier, 1905–1906
 Alphonse Guay, 1907–1914
 Joseph-Arthur Lapointe, 1915–1916; 1921–1924
 Joseph-Edouard Cauchon, 1917–1920
 Rolland Warren, 1920
 Joseph T. Tremblay, 1925–1930
 Ernest Carré, 1930–1939
 Ludovic Couturier, 1939–1941
 Jean-Charles Rochette, 1941–1948
 Alcide Harvey, 1948–1951
 Henri-Paul Couturier, 1951
 Boris Maltais, 1951–1958
 Martial Asselin, 1958–1963
 Louis-Philippe Dufour, 1964–1965
 Paul X. Laberge, 1966–1970
 Lucien Harvey, 1970–1986
 Claudette B. Bergeron, 1986–1989
 Jules Maltais, 1989–1995
 Jean Lajoie, 1995
 Louis Bergeron, 1995–2002
 Jean-Luc Simard, 2002–2009
 Lise Lapointe, 2009-2013
 Michel Couturier, 2013–present

Attractions

La Malbaie's scenic beauty and closeness to nature have always been popular draws. A steamer menu from the earliest days of tourism included a note that “Many families from Quebec visit Malbaie in the summer for the benefit of salt water bathing, the water here being perfectly sea-salt. There is also excellent salmon fishing . . . Sea trout are likewise taken here of a considerable size and several small lakes at a few miles distance afford abundance of trout.”

Modern visitors still come for the scenery, but are more likely to swim in the pools of the Manoir Richelieu than in the salt-water river. And they not only fish, but also go hiking, cycling, and golfing in summer, and skiing, snowshoeing, and snowmobiling in winter. However, “the romance of the French Canadian culture is surely the greatest draw” remarked one regular summer resident from the U.S. when queried.

La Malbaie's most noted landmark is the Fairmont Le Manoir Richelieu, a hotel operated under the Fairmont Hotels and Resorts banner. It was first built in 1899, then rebuilt in 1929 after it was destroyed by fire. The building was acquired by Fairmont in 1998 and reopened under the current banner in 1999. It is particularly noted for its panoramic location on a cliff overlooking the St. Lawrence River. The hotel hosted the 44th G7 summit, June 8–9, 2018.

The Casino de Charlevoix is located next to the Manoir.

La Malbaie has two golf courses. The Manoir's is perched panoramically on the hilltop above the hotel, while the Murray Bay Golf Club is tucked into the bay near the centre of town.

It features hiking and cycling trails and a scenic boat tour on the Malbaie River.

Musée de Charlevoix is a museum of history and popular art located within walking distance of many local hotels and inns.

The Cap-à-l’Aigle sector of La Malbaie (across the bay from the main part of town) is a member of Quebec's association of most beautiful villages. With its many heritage residences and inns, it is a popular place to go for a stroll, particularly in June when its lilac trees are in full bloom. Cap-à-l’Aigle also has a marina.

Agrotourism is a big draw in La Malbaie and throughout Charlevoix, with many local producers welcoming visitors.

Observatoire de l’Astroblème de Charlevoix is an interpretation centre on the meteorite origins of Charlevoix's geography.

Although the whales don't often venture as far upriver as La Malbaie, the town is within easy driving distance of Tadoussac, where visitors can take a whale-watching tour and visit the Saguenay Fjord.

Notable people
 Laure Conan (1845–1924), pen name of Marie-Louise-Félicité Angers, French-Canadian novelist
 Francis Cabot (1925-2011), American gardener and horticulturalist
Ann-Renée Desbiens (1993–), Olympic ice hockey player

See also

1925 Charlevoix–Kamouraska earthquake
Cap-à-l'Aigle, a sector of La Malbaie
Charlevoix-Est Regional County Municipality
Charlevoix tourist train
Comporté River
Hautes-Gorges-de-la-Rivière-Malbaie National Park
Jacob River (Quebec)
List of cities in Quebec
Mailloux River
Malbaie River
Port au Saumon River
Rivière de Chicago
Rivière Jean-Noël Nord-Est

References

External links

 
Cities and towns in Quebec
Incorporated places in Capitale-Nationale